Interstate 70S may refer to:
Interstate 70S (Maryland), a former Interstate highway in Maryland, now numbered as Interstate 270
Interstate 70S (Pennsylvania), a former Interstate highway in Pennsylvania

70S
S